A garage band is a musical group that has obtained little fame or fortune, and therefore is typically relegated—at least metaphorically—to rehearsing and recording not in a rented studio or while being paid to perform on stage like more successful groups, but rather in someone's garage.

It may also refer to:
 A band that performs music in the garage rock genre
 GarageBand, audio production software published by Apple
 GarageBand.com (2003–2010), a website that helped publicize emerging bands
 Garage Band (comics), a 2005 European graphic novel by Gipi
 Grojband, a Canadian/American animated television series.